Gibbon Village Hall is a former municipal hall in Gibbon, Minnesota, United States.  It was built in 1895 with medieval-themed Romanesque Revival architecture.  It was listed on the National Register of Historic Places in 1982 for its local significance in the theme of architecture.  Gibbon Village Hall was nominated for being a well-preserved example of an unusual variation on Romanesque Revival style.

Gibbon's government services relocated to other buildings in the 1970s.

Description
Gibbon Village Hall is a two-story brick building on a corner lot.  It stands on a raised basement of Morton Gneiss with angled buttresses.  The roofline is mostly crenellated, though the prominent corner tower has a battered top.  Surmounting this is an open belfry with an octagonal roof.  The original entrance was on the west side of the tower under a large, semicircular arch, accessed by steep stairs which have since been removed.  A semicircular arched canopy and entryway at the north rear provide access to the basement.

History
Gibbon Village Hall was built in 1895 at a cost of $7,500 and dedicated on November 29th of that year.  It originally housed Gibbon's government offices, fire station, jail, and civic auditorium.  The fire station and jail were in the basement, the auditorium occupied the first floor, and the second floor comprised offices and meeting rooms.

The hall served Gibbon as seat of government and community center until the mid-1970s.  At that time Gibbon's fire services moved to a new facility directly adjacent to the old hall, and the government offices moved to a former bank building two blocks away.

See also
 List of city and town halls in the United States
 National Register of Historic Places listings in Sibley County, Minnesota

References

1895 establishments in Minnesota
Buildings and structures in Sibley County, Minnesota
City and town halls on the National Register of Historic Places in Minnesota
Former seats of local government
Government buildings completed in 1895
National Register of Historic Places in Sibley County, Minnesota
Romanesque Revival architecture in Minnesota